The Kiymbi Dam is a major hydroelectric dam and power station that was opened on the Kiymbi (or Kyimbi) river in 1959. It has been neglected and requires rehabilitation.

Kyimbi River
They are among the highest falls in the African continent to be used for power generation.

Planning
In 1948 it was reported that a company had been formed to build a hydroelectric plant on the Kyimbi river in the north of Katanga, to supply Albertville (now called Kalemie). Operations were expected to start in 1950. The plant was to be built near Bendera.
There were delays. A 1952 report said that construction was still planned.

The plant was eventually built and operated by the Forces de L'Est du Congo (FEC), a company that began operations in 1955 to provide power to the eastern Congo. It began delivering power from two of the five planned turbines in 1959. Additional turbines were to be installed as needed to meet demand. The architect Eugene Palumbo, assigned to the Congo by UNESCO, designed the service city of the dam construction project.

Dam and power plant
Water is carried away from the dam in a horizontal direction along a  covered channel, or gallery, to a point above the power station. The gallery is partially lined with concrete, with a width of  where it is lined and  where it is unlined. The sand is flushed down a gully to the river below.

The water powers the turbines and is discharged into the river below the waterfalls. The power station came online in 1959 with two 8,250 kilowatt generators, with potential for three more of the same capacity. A 132 kW line carried the electricity to Albertville.

Rehabilitation plans
The Democratic Republic of the Congo became independent in June 1960.  The state electricity company, Société nationale d'électricité (SNEL), prepared a study of rehabilitating the Kiymbi power station in 1992.  A 2007 report prepared for the World Bank evaluated rehabilitation of the power plant. The very rough estimate of cost from a "reconnaissance" study would be US$52.06 million for 43 MW installed capacity.  The report recommended making a priority of a more detailed study.

References
Citations

Sources

Dams in the Democratic Republic of the Congo
Hydroelectric power stations in the Democratic Republic of the Congo
Kalemie
South Kivu
Dams completed in 1959
Energy infrastructure completed in 1959
1959 in the Belgian Congo